Ashwathi Vinodh Pillai (born 14 July 2000) is a Swedish professional badminton player originally from Kanyakumari, India. She has participated in several national and international tournaments across Europe, and was part of the Alpha team which won the gold medal at the 2018 Summer Youth Olympics.

Early life 
Pillai was born to Gayathri and Vinod Pillai. She hails from a village near Thucklay in Tamil Nadu. She has one sibling, a brother. She studied at the National Public School, Bangalore, until class 4. 

She was intrigued by badminton during her childhood as she watched her father play along with his friends. In 2009, the Pillai family moved to Sweden owing to her father's professional requirements. While in Sweden, she continued her schooling at Internationella Engelska Skolan. In her class 12, she studied math and biology. She takes inspiration from Carolina Marín, and is reported to admire actress Deepika Padukone.

Career 
Pillai started playing badminton at the age of seven. After moving to Sweden, she did not want to stop training. She entered the Täby badminton club under the coach Rio Willianto and joined the national training centre in Uppsala under the coach Anders Kristiansen. She is coached by Prakash Padukone at his academy in Bengaluru, India, for three weeks every year, and trained by Vimal Kumar and Yousaf Johari. She trains for at least three and a half hours a day, including training by physical trainers from Swedish National Sports Federation.

Pillai participated in several national and international tournaments such as European 8 Nations, Danish Junior International, Glasgow International Junior Championship, and Finnkampen in Helsinki. Later, Pillai was given admission into the National Sports Gymnasium for playing badminton.

Pillai's achievements at national and international tournaments is as follows:
 2015 – Swedish national champion in U-15 category
 2015 – Winner in singles at Swiss Junior Open
 2016 – Runner-up in singles at Polish Junior International Championship
 2017 – Made to quarterfinals of Bulgaria Open
 2018 – Youngest-ever winner of the Swedish Senior National Championship (age 18)
 Youngest qualifier for the Swedish Elite class tournaments

Awards and recognition 
Pillai received the Prestigious Player of the Year award (Girls Junior) 2012–2013 in Stockholm with prize money. She also received a Bengt Erik Hoijers stipend for 2013 with prize money.

References 

Living people
2000 births
People from Kanyakumari district
Sportspeople from Stockholm
Swedish female badminton players
Indian emigrants to Sweden
Swedish people of Indian descent
Badminton players at the 2018 Summer Youth Olympics